Hampshire is an unincorporated community on the North Branch Potomac River in Mineral County, West Virginia, United States. It is part of the Cumberland, MD-WV Metropolitan Statistical Area. Hampshire is located to the south of Bloomington and to the west of Beryl.

References 

Unincorporated communities in Mineral County, West Virginia
Unincorporated communities in West Virginia
Populated places on the North Branch Potomac River